104th Division may refer to:

 104th Division (1st Formation)(People's Republic of China), 1948–1951
 104th Division (2nd Formation)(People's Republic of China), 1951–1955
 104th Jäger Division (Wehrmacht), a unit of the German Army
 104th Division (Imperial Japanese Army)
 104th Infantry Division "Mantova", a unit of the Italian Army
 104th Infantry Division (United States), a unit of the United States Army

See also
 104th Regiment (disambiguation)

sl:Seznam divizij po zaporednih številkah (100. - 149.)#104. divizija